Moon Jung-hoon is a paralympic athlete from South Korea competing mainly in category T53 sprint events.

Moon competed at the 2000 Summer Paralympics winning the gold medal in the T53 400m.  He also competed in the T53 800m and T54 200m but was unable to add to his medal tally.

References

Paralympic athletes of South Korea
Athletes (track and field) at the 2000 Summer Paralympics
Paralympic gold medalists for South Korea
South Korean wheelchair racers
Living people
Year of birth missing (living people)
Medalists at the 2000 Summer Paralympics
Paralympic medalists in athletics (track and field)